Čeveljuša is a waterfall on the river Trebižat, located in village Hrašljani, several kilometers from Ljubuški, Bosnia and Herzegovina.

References 

Waterfalls of Bosnia and Herzegovina
Ljubuški
Čeveljuša